Andrew Samuel Effron (born September 18, 1948) is an American lawyer who serves as a Senior judge of the United States Court of Appeals for the Armed Forces. He took his judicial oath on August 1, 1996, and became chief judge in 2006. His term expired September 30, 2011.

Early life and education
Effron was born in Stamford, Connecticut and grew up in Poughkeepsie, New York. He is a 1966 graduate of Poughkeepsie High School. Effron earned a Bachelor of Arts degree from Harvard College in 1970 and then received a Juris Doctor from Harvard Law School in 1975, and also graduated from The Judge Advocate General's Legal Center and School at the University of Virginia.

Career
From 1970 to 1976, Effron worked for Congressman William A. Steiger.

Effron served on active duty in the United States Army Judge Advocate General's Corps from 1976 to 1979 and then as a reserve officer until 1994.

Effron served as associate general counsel at the Department of Defense from 1979 to 1987, and then served the Senate Armed Services Committee before being appointed to the federal court.

Personal
Effron is the son of Marshall Roven Effron and Marion Nancy (Glickman) Effron . He has a brother and a sister. His father was an officer in the Army Air Corps during World War II and his mother was a civilian employee of the Military Intelligence Division at the War Department. They were married in 1947.

References

|-

1948 births
Living people
20th-century American judges
21st-century American judges
Harvard College alumni
Harvard Law School alumni
The Judge Advocate General's Legal Center and School alumni
Judges of the United States Court of Appeals for the Armed Forces
People from Stamford, Connecticut
Politicians from Poughkeepsie, New York
United States Army officers
United States Army reservists
United States Article I federal judges appointed by Bill Clinton